Christopher David Moyles (born 22 February 1974) is an English radio and television presenter, author and presenter of The Chris Moyles Show on Radio X.

Previously he has presented The Chris Moyles Show on BBC Radio 1 from 2004 to 2012 and Chris Moyles' Quiz Night from 2009 to 2012 on Channel 4.
Moyles has worked at various radio stations, including Radio Luxembourg (under the pseudonym Chris Holmes) and Capital FM. Moyles moved to BBC Radio 1 in July 1997 and left the station in September 2012. He has presented the early breakfast show, a Saturday morning show, and the drive time show (from September 1998 to December 2003), before presenting the breakfast show from 5 January 2004 to 14 September 2012. Moyles is BBC Radio 1's longest serving breakfast presenter. Moyles has become famous for his maverick bad-boy broadcasting style on BBC Radio 1 and has been embroiled in numerous controversies, including accusations of sexism and homophobia, due to statements he has made on the air and in the press.

He frequently made appearances on several television shows including Hotel Babylon, a celebrity version of Supermarket Sweep, Top Gear, The Charlotte Church Show, The F-Word, The Friday Night Project, The One Show, Friday Night with Jonathan Ross, Richard & Judy and The Paul O'Grady Show.

Early life and career
Moyles was born in Leeds, West Riding of Yorkshire, to Christopher, a postman, and housewife Hannah Veronica "Vera" Moyles, (from Dublin) and he was educated at Mount St Mary's Catholic High School. While at school, he began his broadcasting career at WBHS (Wakefield's Broadcast to Hospitals Service), a voluntary staffed hospital radio station in the West Yorkshire city.

After WBHS, Moyles moved to local radio station Aire FM as an assistant for DJ Carl Kingston. During this time, he was also a presenter on Radio Top Shop in the Leeds Briggate branch. After hosting his own Saturday Evening Show on Aire FM (and occasionally serving as a stand-in presenter), he was then employed as a presenter at Radio Luxembourg in 1992, until the station closed.

In 1993, he gained a job at the Pulse of West Yorkshire, presenting the evening show from 7.00 pm–10.00 pm. He remained there until early 1994 when he was dismissed for comments made about the station's previous programme controller. Moyles subsequently joined Signal 1 in Stoke-on-Trent – again presenting The Evening Bit from 7.00 pm–10.00 pm. He remained there until he was dismissed by the station's programme controller, who he refers to as a "spineless bastard" in his first autobiography. In 1995 Moyles was heard on the Chiltern Radio Network, presenting the evening show from 7.00 pm–10.00 pm, before taking on the late show from 10.00 pm–1.00 am. This show was simulcast on Horizon Radio, Chiltern Radio, Severn Sound and Northants 96.

In 1996, Moyles joined London station Capital FM, hosting his weekend show The Late Bit, which went out on Friday and Saturday evenings, and covering for other DJs. It was at Capital that Moyles fell out with fellow DJ Neil Fox. After declining the offer of presenting the breakfast show on rival station Kiss 100, Moyles joined Radio 1 in July 1997.

Radio 1
Moyles was voted one of the Faces for 97 by SKY magazine and presented his first show on Radio 1 on 28 July 1997, hosting the 4.00 am–7.00 am Early Breakfast show – soon called The Early Bit. In May 1998, his work was recognised with the award of the Silver Sony Awards DJ of the Year, and he was styling himself as 'The Saviour of Early Morning Radio'. Within the year Moyles was promoted to a Saturday breakfast, then Saturday mid-morning slot from 10.00 am–1.00 pm. At Radio 1, he presented most of his shows with David "Comedy Dave" Vitty, who worked behind the scenes at the station before Moyles' arrival.

After standing in regularly for Kevin Greening and Zoe Ball on the Radio 1 Breakfast Show, Moyles' next promotion came in October 1998 when he took control of the drivetime show from 4.00 pm–5:45 pm. The show was extended to 3.00 pm–5:45 pm in February 2001. Moyles has co-presented the show from 1998 with his sidekick.

On 5 January 2004, Moyles started presenting Radio 1's breakfast programme, named The Chris Moyles Show, switching places with Sara Cox. He had been appointed to increase the ratings for the show and did so, putting on an extra 1,000,000 listeners to the audience in the first quarter of 2004. After a successful first year, Moyles was awarded 'DJ of the Year' by readers of The Sun.

By 2005, Moyles and his team had succeeded in increasing the morning audience, with his programme's audience rising to 6.5 million. This was coupled with an increase in the overall Radio 1 audience share. With 895,000 listeners in London in the third quarter of 2005, he succeeded in overtaking Johnny Vaughan to take the position of the capital's most listened to youth breakfast show. Moyles' audience ratings continued to increase each week and led to him winning a gold Sony Radio Award in 2006 for best entertainment show.

With the release of the RAJAR listening figures on 3 August 2006, Moyles had added a further 470,000 listeners to the Breakfast Show, taking the average listenership up to 6.79 million. On 10 May 2007, RAJAR figures confirmed that Moyles had increased his listening figures to 7.06 million, breaking the seven million barrier for the first time with the station having 10.55 million listeners overall. Moyles again increased his audience to 7.72 million as of 1 May 2008 slightly narrowing the gap between him and Terry Wogan, the highest-rated radio show in the UK at the time. The station's overall listener figure is now over 11 million.

On 12 May 2008 The Chris Moyles Show won its second Sony radio gold award for 'best breakfast show'. At this time he was given another half-hour on his show going from 7.00 am–10.00 am to 6.30 am–10.00 am.

On 7 September 2009 Moyles became the longest serving breakfast presenter on Radio 1, breaking the record previously set by Tony Blackburn.

In March 2011, Moyles and his colleague David Vitty beat the record for the longest continuous Radio 1 show, on Radio 1's Longest Show Ever with Chris Moyles and Comedy Dave for Comic Relief. Between 16 and 18 March they beat both Simon Mayo's 1999 record of 37 hours and the 'Radio DJ Endurance Marathon (Team)' Guinness World Record by broadcasting for 52 hours for Comic Relief initially raising £2.4 million, and with an audience of 2.84 million, it was the most popular live BBC Red Button radio feature ever. The event raised a final total of £2,821,831.

On 1 July 2011, it was announced that Moyles would remain within the BBC until at least 2014, ending speculation that he would move to a commercial rival. The deal was estimated to be worth £1 million. This would have allowed the presenter to reach his 10-year anniversary on The Chris Moyles Show. However, on 11 July 2012, Moyles announced that he would be leaving the breakfast show and the station on 14 September. It was announced later the same day that Nick Grimshaw would replace him.

Radio X
On 7 September 2015, it was announced Chris Moyles would return to radio on the newly re-branded Radio X (previously XFM) hosting the new Chris Moyles Show. The show began airing on 21 September 2015 from 6.30 am–10.00 am, returning to his former breakfast slot and was going head to head with his BBC Radio 1 breakfast show replacement, Nick Grimshaw. Chris Moyles stated Dominic Byrne, who read the news on his BBC Radio 1 show, would return with him, as would producer Pippa Taylor. 
On 19 April 2016 it was announced that there would be an additional pre-recorded show on Saturday mornings between 8 am-11.00 am featuring clips from the week, interviews with studio guests plus new content, which means that Chris is on air on Radio X 6 days a week.

Work outside radio

BT Red Nose Climb and Speaking Clock
Moyles was one of a team of celebrities who climbed Mount Kilimanjaro to raise money for Comic Relief, reaching the summit on 7 March 2009. He was joined by his show's producers, Rachel Mallender and Pippa Taylor, and BBC Radio 1 controller, Andy Parfitt. Also on the climb were Girls Aloud members Cheryl Cole and Kimberley Walsh, Fearne Cotton, Ben Shephard, Gary Barlow, Ronan Keating, Denise Van Outen and Alesha Dixon. He recorded a parody song around this time to promote the climb, mentioning all the names of the people that were also taking part – it was based on Lily Allen's "The Fear", and was called "(A month off of) The Beer".

From 3 February – 23 March 2009, Moyles was joined by Kimberley Walsh, Cheryl Cole, Gary Barlow, Ronan Keating, Ben Shephard and Fearne Cotton to help raise money for charity by reading the time on the Speaking Clock.

Film voice work
Moyles has provided his voice and/or likeness to a number of films and games. His face was used in 24: The Game, and his voice can be heard in the films Wimbledon, War of the Worlds and Robots. In some of these films, his voice was only used for the UK version.

Television presenting
Moyles has branched out his work into television. In 2002, his own Channel 5 show, Live with Chris Moyles, ran five shows a week for 13 weeks. Moyles was replaced by Christian O'Connell, before the programme was cancelled.

He and sidekick Dave Vitty had their own TV show, also entitled The Chris Moyles Show like their former Radio 1 show, which was aired from 1998–99 on the now-defunct UK satellite and cable channel UK Play.

Moyles voiced the fourth and final series of Sky1 show The Villa and has occasionally presented Top of the Pops. He has also worked for the Comic Relief and Children in Need charities on their telecasts.

Moyles has presented a number of episodes of Big Brother's Big Mouth. Daily Mirror journalist Rob Leigh once said of his Big Brother's Big Mouth presenting that "Chris Moyles may be Marmite for the ears on radio but never quite nails it on TV, even with his relative star power". He also presented The Big Breakfast on Channel 4 several times between 2000 and 2002.

In 2003, Moyles presented the launch of BBC Three. The launch night (not to be confused with the 2022 relaunch night) was simulcast on BBC Two.

Moyles launched a new show on Channel 4, called Chris Moyles' Quiz Night on 22 March 2009. The show consists of Moyles alongside three other celebrities partaking in a traditional pub-style quiz. The original series had the four competing to win an item that belonged to Moyles but this has since developed into a more traditional quiz with the loser singing karaoke-style at the end of the show. The opening show received poor viewing figures attracting just 6% of total audience for the timeslot. It was continued for a second series between 26 February and 11 April 2010, a third series following between 1 November and 22 December 2010 and fourth between 15 July and 2 September 2011. After 5 series, the show was shelved.

On 24 October 2011, The Metro announced that Moyles would co-present a new dating show, The Love Machine, alongside Stacey Solomon for Sky. Moyles confirmed this on his radio show that morning.

Other television appearances
Moyles appeared on the ITV show The X Factor: Battle of the Stars and had minor success. He was voted out of the show on 4 June 2006 in the semi-final. Following this appearance, stories in the New Statesman and The Sun both reported that Moyles was looking to relaunch his television career; rumours suggested that he had been offered his own show by ITV. Moyles has spoken of a desire to transfer the format of his radio show to the TV, but otherwise has thus far stayed clear of a conventional TV format.

Moyles regularly appears on This Morning and Celebrity Juice.

Moyles played himself in an episode of the drama Hotel Babylon which aired on 15 February 2007 and appeared on a celebrity version of Supermarket Sweep that broadcast on the same day. He has appeared as a guest on numerous British television shows, including the ninth series of Top Gear, Never Mind The Buzzcocks, which immortalised Moyles as an "oily pig in a dunce hat" The Charlotte Church Show, The F-Word, The Friday Night Project, Richard & Judy and The New Paul O'Grady Show.

In 2008, Moyles appeared on the Brit Awards to present the award for the best live act, and appeared in the BBC documentary series Comedy Map of Britain. He has appeared on Channel 4's Big Brother: Celebrity Hijack TV programme as well as an appearance as a team captain on the Channel 4 show Alan Carr's Celebrity Ding Dong and on 18 July 2008 he appeared on Jimmy Carr's show on Channel 4, 8 Out of 10 Cats.

On 23 February 2009, Moyles was the guest on BBC One's The One Show to promote the BT Red Nose climb of Mount Kilimanjaro. He appeared again on the show on 26 February 2010 to talk about and promote the second series of Chris Moyles' Quiz Night. In July 2009, he featured in an episode of the genealogy documentary series Who Do You Think You Are? on BBC One where he explored his Irish ancestry. He visited Ireland and Belgium, where his great-grandfather fought and died in the First World War. On the programme Moyles discovered that his surname means bald servant from the Irish "Ó Maolmanach". He also co-presented Children in Need Rocks Manchester in November 2011. Moyles appeared on the quiz show The Million Pound Drop along with Andi Peters in February 2012, they won £25,000 to divide between their chosen charities.

Moyles appeared on Children in Need on 16 November 2012, performing Bring Me Sunshine on stage with holograms of comedy duo Morecambe and Wise in an effort to raise money for the charity.

On 31 October 2022 Moyles was announced by ITV as a campmate of the 2022 series of I'm a Celebrity...Get Me Out of Here!. On the promo video Moyles says "It's only three weeks in the middle of a jungle; What could possibly go wrong?" He was voted out sixth on 24 November.

Autobiography
Moyles' autobiography, The Gospel according to Chris Moyles: The Story of One Man and His Mouth was released by Ebury Press on 5 October 2006.

On 4 October 2007 a follow-up book Chris Moyles: The Difficult Second Book, published by Ebury Press, was officially released. The Difficult Second Book was released in paperback on 1 May 2008. Stewart Lee, on his own programme Stewart Lee's Comedy Vehicle, commented that the title of the book suggests "a degree of irony and self-awareness largely absent from the text itself" and then went on to deconstruct and mock the book's contents.

Stage work
On 16 May 2012 it was announced that Chris Moyles had been cast to play the part of King Herod in an arena tour of Andrew Lloyd Webber's musical Jesus Christ Superstar. Moyles reprised his role as King Herod when Jesus Christ Superstar began another arena tour on 1 October 2013. Moyles also toured a solo stage show, "Chris Moyles Live".

Presenting style
Moyles uses a zoo format, and therefore relies on his team members and audience participation for his show's games and quizzes and for other sources of comedy. He is renowned for his boorish manner, quick temper, and put-downs. It is this approach which most commonly leads to criticism of Moyles. It has also caused him to become involved in numerous controversies related to perceived offensive statements. However, Moyles generally accepts counter attacks in the same manner and routinely derides himself for being overweight and so forth, often in the lyrics of jingles. Due to his fascination with radio, Moyles regularly discusses the process of making the show, often spoofing clichéd radio practices. Many of his show's features are homages to or exaggerations of other radio features.

Parody songs

In December 2000, he parodied the Eminem song "Stan" that was No. 1 in the charts at the time, with a seasonal Christmas themed variation called "Stanta", instead. It became one of the most popular requested parodies and was often played more than once during the course of a show.

In October 2004, Moyles and The Chris Moyles Show team replaced U2's "Vertigo" at number one in the UK Official Download Chart with their download-only charity song "Dogz Don't Kill People (Wabbitz Do)", under the name 'Mouldie Lookin' Stain'. The song was a spoof of Goldie Lookin' Chain's "Guns Don't Kill People Rappers Do" (itself a spoof rap song) and proceeds went to Comic Relief. At the time of its release, it was the fastest selling download on UK charts.

Moyles has parodied several Kaiser Chiefs songs under the name "The Kaiser Chefs". These include "I Predict A Diet" (Parody of I Predict a Riot) and "Donny" (Parody of Ruby). Chris and Ricky Wilson of the Kaiser Chiefs (both Leeds United fans) said they had accidentally given Doncaster Rovers fans an unofficial anthem with "Donny" after Doncaster Rovers beat Leeds United 1–0 in the 2008 League One Play-off Final.

During the 2006 FIFA World Cup in Germany, Moyles organised a parody of England World Cup songs, to ridicule the number of songs there were out at the time. "José – The Special One" (a parody of "Rosé" by The Feeling was written on team manager José Mourinho's departure from Chelsea and was banned after the club complained to the BBC (although subsequently played repeatedly on Moyles' show and on Radio 5 Live). He made a parody of "We Have Got to Zero Baby", a take on Enrique Iglesias's "Hero", which describes how his football team, Leeds United, managed to claw back a 15-point deficit in League One in only 5 games. In November 2007, he used Hoosiers – "Goodbye Mr A" for "Goodbye Mr. M" where he sings about the England football manager Steve McClaren being sacked.

Often Moyles will pick a track because of the silliness of its lyrics, for instance "Smile" by Lily Allen was parodied by Moyles's invention "Silly Allen", in a song called "Piles" and Natasha Bedingfield's "I Wanna Have Your Babies" written by Comedy Dave and performed in May 2007. In the same month, he performed a parody of Hellogoodbye's hit "Here" called "Beer in My Arms" in which he describes how much he really dislikes the song, calling it 'daft'. Moyles also covered Puretone "Addicted to Bass" with "Addicted to Plaice", which covers the subject of being addicted to fish. In September 2007, he performed "Suicidal" a parody of the UK number one Sean Kingston's "Beautiful Girls", in which he talks about how the song makes him feel suicidal and wonders why it reached number one.

Although of 2008, UK's chart no.1 Basshunter was renamed "Chuffhunter" in which he mocks the song and those that would buy it, Kylie Minogue's "Bow Wow Wow" and a re-write of the Estelle song "American Boy", named "Somerset Boy". In the past, he has parodied include Billie Piper's "Honey to the Bee" as "Guinness For Me", All Seeing Eye's "Walk Like a Panther", Will Smith's "Gettin Jiggy Wit It", and McFly's "All About You" as "He Don't Use Shampoo". Moyles has also written Baked Beans, a parody of Same Jeans by The View, and "Lunch in this Pub", originally the Usher single "Love in this Club". One of his recent parodies, "No Hair" – sung by "follicly-challenged" newscaster Dominic Byrne – is a cover of Jordin Sparks's "No Air (ft Chris Brown)".

Another two of Moyles' recent parodies are "Lorry Driver" which is a cover of Britney Spears' song "Womanizer" and "The Boy Does Plenty" by "Adrian Dixon", originally a song by Alesha Dixon, both of which are written by 'Comedy Dave' Vitty.

In March 2009 Moyles released a parody song called "Dreaming of Debbie McGee". The song was about a man who has recurring dreams of the assistant on The Paul Daniels Magic Show. Comedy Dave wrote the song, and Paul Daniels asked for it to be made into an MP3 file after hearing it on air. It was a parody of the Kings of Leon song "Revelry". In April 2009, McGee recorded a reply which was played on air and was a parody of the same song called Dreaming of Moylesy.

Moyles released "Waterproof" in July 2009, a parody of the La Roux song "Bulletproof". This song has an approved record deal to be used on a parody album, should Chris wish to do so.

Moyles has released an album entitled The Parody Album. Recording began in September 2009, and the album was released on 23 November.

The official Moyles Parody Album game entitled Parody Island was released to help promote the album and allow players to hear snippets from his new album.

The Chris Moyles Show was credited with the debut of the unofficial England World Cup Song, written and performed by Chico Slimani a parody of his hit single "It's Chico Time" and originally named "It's England Time". Slimani recorded the single after having a 'vision' that England won the 2010 World Cup and that in the celebrations, commentators made reference to his song. The single debuted, Monday 8 February 2010.

Controversies
Moyles has been censured several times by the Broadcasting Standards Commission and Ofcom. This happened during his time at both Capital and Radio 1. For example, the regulatory bodies upheld complaints when Moyles threatened and bullied Neil Fox in October 2002 with the claim that "I'm gonna tear his head off and poo down his neck"; and also in early 2002, when he said "he would take the virginity of Charlotte Church", when the child star reached sixteen.

When he first arrived at Radio 1, John Peel took an instant dislike to Moyles and accused him of being a "DLT-in-waiting". Moyles retorted that Peel was a "Kenny Everett-in-waiting, because Kenny Everett's dead and it's only a matter of time before John pops his clogs". In his biography Moyles said that he mended his relationship with Peel and felt a sense of loss that he had not got to know him before his death.

In September 2008, Moyles, along with other British radio presenters, was criticised for on-air promotion of drinking to excess.

On-air profanity
In February 2006, Moyles apologised, along with the BBC, after swearing when speaking to a caller live on air. He made the outburst while teasing a mother-of-three from Newcastle during an on-air feature which her children had interrupted. "You've got three kids from some fuckin'..." he blurted out, before apologising profusely for his mistake. The BBC issued six apologies, adding that such mistakes could occur during live broadcasts such as Moyles' show. The BBC was later cleared by broadcasting regulator Ofcom over the incident.

In July 2006, communications watchdog Ofcom found Moyles in Breach of rule 1.5 of the Ofcom Broadcasting Code Rules for an incident in which he referred to female listeners as "dirty whores". A listener objected to an item in which the presenter discussed people who urinated in the shower. He considered that the presenter's reference to women who did this as "dirty whores" was unacceptable at this time of the morning.

Pay fracas
Alongside a number of other Radio 1 and Radio 2 presenters, Moyles crossed a strike picket line in 2005. BBC staff were striking over recently announced job cuts. A report by the BBC Trust on 2 June 2008 revealed that Moyles was paid £630,000 in 2007.
Moyles revealed in September 2009 that he took a 20 per cent pay cut three months earlier, quoting the reason "I want to work at the BBC, which is trying to save some of its gazillions".
On 22 September 2010 Moyles spoke out on air about not being paid by the BBC in two months.

Accusations of homophobia
Moyles was accused of homophobia in May 2006, when he rejected a ringtone by saying "I don't want that one, it's gay", live on air. This led to a number of complaints to the BBC. They argued that the use of the word "gay" in this context was homophobic. The BBC governors said that Moyles was simply "keeping up with developments in English usage".

The Programme Complaints Committee said that, "The word 'gay', in addition to being used to mean 'homosexual' or 'carefree', was often now used to mean 'lame' or 'rubbish'. In describing a ringtone as gay, the DJ was conveying that he thought it was 'rubbish' rather than 'homosexual'. Moyles was not being homophobic". The panel acknowledged that this use of the word 'gay' in a derogatory sense could cause offence to some listeners and counselled caution on its use.

In June, LGBT charity Stonewall marched with placards demanding the dismissal of Moyles during Europride in London. According to Stonewall, "Chris Moyles is not helping young LGBT people struggling to come out through his comments". Stonewall gave Moyles the award of "Bully of the Year" at their annual Stonewall Awards that same year.

Those defending Moyles have noted that Aled Haydn Jones, his show's producer who has worked with Moyles since 2001, is openly gay. Moyles was quoted in The Guardian by Stonewall chief executive Ben Summerskill as saying "Yeah, I'm homophobic, I don't like the gays. Sorry, it just does my head in. We have a token gay on the show!" In his book The Difficult Second Book, Moyles says that he was responding to another article with sarcasm, and was subsequently quoted out of context.

Moyles was censured by Ofcom following eight complaints made after a broadcast on 20 January 2009 in which he told listeners it was the birthday of Will Young and then went on to sing "Evergreen" and "Leave Right Now" in a high pitched and effeminate voice, changing the lyrics to references to Young's sexuality. Ofcom stated that the language used could have been "interpreted by listeners as promoting and condoning certain negative stereotypes based on sexual orientation" and whilst acknowledging the intention was to be humorous in their opinion it could have been perceived as ""hostile" and "pejorative". The media regulator also said in their view that because of the show's breakfast time slot that attracts a young audience it "had the potential to encourage children to discriminate against others" based on their actual or perceived sexual orientation and "ran the risk of being imitated on the playground" causing "unnecessary distress".

Auschwitz comments
On 20 January 2009, Moyles made comments on his radio show regarding the family history programme Who Do You Think You Are? and the Holocaust. Referring to his trips while filming the programme, Moyles said "I went off to Ireland and other places to film and unlike a lot of the Who Do You Think You Are? shows I didn't go to Auschwitz. Pretty much everyone goes there whether or not they're Jewish. They just seem to pass through there on their way to Florida". Celebrities featured on Who Do You Think You Are? including Stephen Fry, Jerry Springer and Natasha Kaplinsky, have traced their family histories back to Jews murdered by the Nazis during the Second World War. The BBC released a statement: "Anyone who listens to the Chris Moyles Show will know he has an irreverent style. However, we regret that on this occasion his comments were misjudged and we are speaking to Chris and his team about them".

N-Dubz behaviour
On 12 January 2010, hip-hop trio N-Dubz appeared on the Chris Moyles Show on Radio 1. The show received a text message from a female listener saying that band member Dappy was "vile" and "a little boy with a silly hat" and that N-Dubz were "losers". Dappy secretly copied her phone number from the studio console and sent abusive and threatening text messages to the woman the following day including one telling her she was "gonna die!". Moyles said of the resulting criticism: "I feel let down by him, I've supported them and said, 'Do you know what, N-Dubz aren't just a bunch of dippy chavs, they're really good'. So for him to go and do something like that is a bit rubbish".

Tax avoidance
In 2012 Chris Moyles was involved in a tax avoidance scheme and requested a court order to prevent the press from reporting it, because he claimed it would infringe his human rights. In February 2014 it was reported that he had attempted to avoid up to £400,000 in income tax by claiming losses of £1,000,000 on a used car dealership scheme.

Discography

Studio albums

 The Parody Album (2009) UK Chart No. 17
 The Difficult Second Album (2012) UK Chart No. 13

Awards and honours
Moyles has won several Sony Radio Awards: Silver in 1998; Gold in 2006; nominated in 2007: Gold in 2008; Bronze in 2009; and Silver in 2010.

He was voted "Best DJ" by readers of The Sun newspaper and readers of Loaded magazine.

In 2007 the rugby league team Featherstone Rovers named their ground after him. Historically known as Post Office Road, it was renamed via a sponsorship deal as the Chris Moyles Stadium. On 7 July 2007 Moyles appeared as a presenter at the UK leg of Live Earth in Wembley Stadium in London.

Bibliography

References

External links

 ChrisMoyles.net
 
 The Chris Moyles Show on Radio X

1974 births
Living people
People from Leeds
English people of Irish descent
English radio DJs
English radio presenters
English television presenters
British parodists
People educated at Mount St Mary's Catholic High School, Leeds
The X Factor (British TV series) contestants
BBC Radio 1 presenters
London
Top of the Pops presenters
I'm a Celebrity...Get Me Out of Here! (British TV series) participants